Andrew Walter Reid (born March 19, 1958) is an American football coach who is the head coach for the Kansas City Chiefs of the National Football League (NFL). Reid was previously head coach of the Philadelphia Eagles from 1999 to 2012. From 2001 to 2012, he was also the Eagles' executive vice president of football operations becoming the general manager. He is the only NFL coach to win 100 games and appear in four consecutive conference championships with two different franchises. Reid is regarded as one of the greatest coaches in NFL history.

Reid began his professional coaching career with the Green Bay Packers, where he served as an offensive assistant from 1992 to 1998 and won a Super Bowl title in Super Bowl XXXI. He held his first head coaching position with the Eagles in 1999, who became perennial postseason contenders under his leadership. Reid led the Eagles to nine playoff runs, six division titles, five NFC Championship Games (including four consecutive from 2001 to 2004), and an appearance in Super Bowl XXXIX where they lost to the New England Patriots. Despite Reid's consistent success, the Eagles declined and missed the playoffs in the 2011 and 2012 seasons, leading to his dismissal from Philadelphia.

Reid was immediately hired as the head coach of the Chiefs in 2013, where he quickly revitalized the struggling franchise. He helped end the eight-game playoff losing streak that began in 1993. In 10 seasons with Kansas City, he has led them to successful seasons with nine postseason appearances, seven division titles, five consecutive AFC Championship Games, three Super Bowl appearances (LIV, LV, LVII), and two wins (LIV, LVII), with the second being against his former longtime team, the Eagles.

Early life
Reid was born in Los Angeles on March 19, 1958. He attended John Marshall High School and worked as a vendor at Dodger Stadium as a teenager. He also played youth sports in East Hollywood at Lemon Grove Recreation Center; Pete Arbogast was one of his coaches. Arbogast is the radio announcer for the USC football team, and was the radio play-by-play announcer for the Cincinnati Bengals. In 1971 at age 13, Reid was on Monday Night Football participating in the Punt, Pass, and Kick competition; he was already so large that he wore the jersey of Les Josephson (6'1", 207 pounds).

Reid played offensive tackle at Glendale Community College in Glendale, California, and planned to transfer to Stanford but injured his knee. BYU head coach LaVell Edwards wanted Reid's teammate and best friend Randy Tidwell, and also recruited him to the team to help persuade Tidwell to come to BYU. At BYU, Reid was a teammate of Jim McMahon and Tom Holmoe. Teammates recalled that Reid did not play often but was very analytical, closely studying Edwards and offensive coordinator Doug Scovil. BYU won the 1980 Holiday Bowl in his senior year.

Coaching career

College 
Reid had thought of becoming a writer, but frequent questions to Edwards about football strategy caused the head coach to suggest coaching as a career. After graduating from BYU in 1981, Reid spent one year as a graduate assistant on the school's football coaching staff; colleagues included Scovil, Norm Chow, and Mike Holmgren. He spent the next nine years as an offensive line coach with four colleges. During his college coaching career, he was on the staff for teams like the San Francisco Gators, Northern Arizona Lumberjacks, UTEP Miners, and Missouri Tigers. It was with the 1986 Northern Arizona University team that he coached Frank Pollack, who went on to play for six seasons with the San Francisco 49ers.

Green Bay Packers
Reid was hired by Holmgren at the Green Bay Packers in 1992, the same year quarterback Brett Favre became a member of that team. In 1995, he became the assistant offensive line and tight ends coach, where he helped lead the 1996 team to a Super Bowl XXXI win over the New England Patriots. Reid was named the Packers' quarterbacks coach in 1997, replacing Marty Mornhinweg, who left to be the offensive coordinator for his predecessor in Green Bay, Steve Mariucci. Mariucci wanted Reid to be his offensive coordinator in San Francisco, but Holmgren prevented the move.

Philadelphia Eagles

1999 to 2004
Following a league-worst 3–13 season in 1998, the Philadelphia Eagles fired head coach Ray Rhodes and began a comprehensive search for a replacement. The Eagles initially considered hiring Holmgren to replace Rhodes, but Holmgren instead joined the Seattle Seahawks as head coach and urged Eagles owner Jeff Lurie to hire Reid. Simultaneously, Eagles' president Joe Banner felt that the team needed a detail-oriented head coach after the team's steady decline under Rhodes. As Banner began his search for a new head coach, he asked other teams' general managers for names of coaches that players complained were excessively detail-oriented; Reid's name surfaced, and Reid emerged as a leading candidate for the Eagles' head coaching job. 

Consistent with his reputation for a focus on football details, Reid arrived at his interview with the Eagles with a five-inch thick book he developed on how he would go about running the team if given the job. The Eagles hired Reid on January 11, 1999; he was the second-youngest head coach in the league after Jon Gruden and the first then to be hired as a head coach without first having served as an offensive or defensive coordinator. Some in the Philadelphia news media criticized the hiring, citing the availability of other candidates who had already served previously as successful head coaches. 

As he set about leading the Eagles, one of Reid's first major decisions was drafting dual-threat quarterback Donovan McNabb in the first round with the second overall pick, although Reid started former Packers' backup Doug Pederson in the first nine games of the 1999 season. In Reid's first season in Philadelphia, the Eagles improved their record by two games over 1998, finishing 5–11. Among the five wins was the team's first road victory in 19 games, a 20–16 road victory over the Chicago Bears on October 17. In 2000, the Eagles posted an 11–5 regular-season record and won their first playoff game since the 1995 season, beating the Tampa Bay Buccaneeers in Philadelphia on New Year's Eve.

In 2001, Reid's Eagles won the first of four consecutive NFC East titles, the longest such streak in franchise history, and advanced to the conference championship game in 2001, 2002, 2003 and 2004, losing this game on the first three occasions. The 2003 team qualified for postseason play after opening the season with two losses, both at home, and was also the first NFL team ever to reach the conference title round of the playoffs after having been shut out at home on opening day. The 2004 team was the second NFC East squad to defeat all of its division rivals (New York Giants, Dallas Cowboys, and Washington Redskins) twice during the same regular season (the Dallas Cowboys did it in 1998). The 2004 Eagles clinched the NFC #1-seed with a 13–1 record and proceeded to rest their starters for the final two games. After three straight NFC Championship losses, the team beat the Atlanta Falcons by a score of 27–10 and made it to Super Bowl XXXIX but fell to the New England Patriots 24–21.

In 2001, Reid was named executive vice president of football operations of the Eagles, effectively making him the team's general manager. Although the Eagles had general managers  after 2005 (Tom Heckert from 2005 to 2010 and Howie Roseman from 2010 until Reid's departure), Reid had the final say on football matters.

2005–2006

The 2005 season was difficult for Reid as he sought to deal with wide receiver Terrell Owens' flamboyant persona, which forced Reid to permanently deactivate him midway through the 2005 season. A couple of weeks later quarterback Donovan McNabb suffered a season-ending injury, leaving the Eagles without the services of two of their star players. The Eagles lost eight of their last ten games and finished 6–10. With their third win of the season – a 23–20 win over the Oakland Raiders – Reid passed Greasy Neale to become the winningest coach in franchise history.

The Eagles enjoyed a rollercoaster campaign under Reid in 2006. The season appeared to be lost by October with another season-ending injury to McNabb, turning a 4–1 start into a mid-season breakdown which left the team 5–5. After an embarrassing 45–21 defeat at the hands of the Indianapolis Colts, the Eagles were on the verge of elimination from the playoffs. Reid coached backup quarterback, Jeff Garcia, and the 5–6 Eagles, to victories over a slew of NFC rivals including the Carolina Panthers, Washington Redskins, New York Giants, and Dallas Cowboys. The Eagles, at 10–6, won the NFC East division title, as well as an NFC wild card game against the New York Giants. Their season ended at the hands of an opportune New Orleans Saints team in the NFC Divisional Round.

2007–2011

In the 2007 season, Reid led the Eagles to an 8–8 season with no appearance in the postseason.

In the 2008 season, Reid's 9–6–1 Eagles managed to knock off the defending Super Bowl Champions, the New York Giants, in the divisional game, leading the Eagles to a fifth NFC Championship game, where they lost to the Arizona Cardinals by a score of 32–25. He coached the NFC to a 30–21 win in the 2009 Pro Bowl. However, the team was devastated by the death of Jim Johnson, who had been the defensive coordinator for Reid's entire career and had helped turn the Eagles into one of the NFL's elite defenses.

In the 2009 season, Reid failed to win a first-round post-season game for the first time in his career, with his 11–5 Eagles being eliminated by the first place Dallas Cowboys by a score of 34–14 in the Wild Card Round. Over the offseason, the Eagles traded longtime starting quarterback Donovan McNabb to the Redskins. After Week 2 of the 2010 season, Reid named Michael Vick the starting quarterback of the Eagles.

In the 2010 season, Reid led the Eagles to 10–6 record in the regular season and qualified for the playoffs. In the Wild Card Round against the Green Bay Packers, the Eagles fell 21–16.

Reid was named the Earle "Greasy" Neale Award winner for the third time in 2010.

In the 2011 season, Reid led the Eagles to an 8–8 season with no appearance in the postseason.

2012
In the 2012 season, Reid and the Eagles struggled to a 4–12 record, the worst of his head coaching tenure. The year also marked the first time the Eagles missed the postseason in consecutive years under Reid. On December 31, 2012, the day after the season ended with an embarrassing 42–7 loss to the New York Giants, Eagles owner Jeffrey Lurie announced that Reid's contract would not be renewed. Reid was the longest-tenured head coach in the NFL prior to his release. Reid provided encouragement to his successor as Eagles head coach, Chip Kelly.

Lurie said that Reid's induction into the Philadelphia Eagles Hall of Fame was inevitable, and players gave their former coach a standing ovation during his last meeting with them. During his 14-year tenure with the Eagles, Reid compiled the best win total (120), winning percentage (.609) and playoff victory total (10) in team history. He captured six division titles and five trips to the NFC Championship game. During this period, no other franchise earned more divisional playoff round appearances (7) and only Bill Belichick's New England Patriots exceeded Philadelphia's (5) conference championship game appearances with (6). Despite his success, however, Reid was ultimately unable to lead the Eagles to a Super Bowl title.

Reid sent 19 players to 44 Pro Bowl appearances, the highest total for any team in the NFL during that period. None of these players had ever appeared in a Pro Bowl before Reid was hired.

Since 1990, only fourteen first-time head coaches remained with their original team for eight or more years: Reid (1999–2012), Tennessee's Jeff Fisher (1994–2010), Brian Billick (1999–2007 with Baltimore), Bill Cowher (1992–2006 with Pittsburgh), Dennis Green (1992–2001 with Minnesota), Tom Coughlin (1995–2002 with Jacksonville), Jack Del Rio (2003–2011 with Jacksonville), Cincinnati's Marvin Lewis (2003–2018), Green Bay's Mike McCarthy (2006–2018), New Orleans's Sean Payton (2006–2021), Pittsburgh's Mike Tomlin (2007–present), Baltimore's John Harbaugh (2008–present), Dallas's Jason Garrett (2011–2019), and Minnesota's Mike Zimmer (2014–2021).

Kansas City Chiefs

2013–2015
Reid expected the Eagles to not extend him and was already preparing to hire a new coaching staff. Three teams reportedly had airplanes in Philadelphia to fly him to interviews. On January 4, 2013, Reid reached a five-year contract agreement to become the head coach of the Chiefs. On the same day, the Chiefs fired general manager Scott Pioli. Originally, Reid's contract made him the final authority in football matters, the same power he had in Philadelphia. A week later, however, the Chiefs hired John Dorsey, who had previously worked with Reid as an assistant in Green Bay, as general manager. Reid and Chiefs owner Clark Hunt announced that Dorsey would have the final say in personnel matters. On the same day, Hunt announced that Reid and Dorsey would report to him on an equal basis; in the past Chiefs coaches reported to the general manager.

In Reid's first game as head coach, the Chiefs beat the Jacksonville Jaguars 28–2. It was the widest margin of victory for the Chiefs on opening day since they defeated the Denver Broncos in 1963 by a score of 59–7.

In Week 3, Reid returned to Lincoln Financial Field in Philadelphia for a Thursday Night Football game between the Chiefs and his former team, the Philadelphia Eagles. As Reid walked out onto the field before the game started, the crowd gave him a standing ovation. The Chiefs went on to win 26–16 and Reid received a Gatorade shower from his team.

Reid went on to lead the Chiefs to a 9–0 record to start the season, tied for the best start in franchise history. Despite losing five of their last seven games, the Chiefs finished with an 11–5 record to clinch a wild card spot in the AFC playoffs. In the wild card round, they were defeated by the Indianapolis Colts 45–44 after surrendering a 28-point lead in the third quarter.

Under Reid, the Chiefs recorded a winning record in the 2014 season, finishing 9–7. However, they failed to qualify for the playoffs.

In 2015, the Chiefs were in danger of missing the playoffs for a second consecutive year after they lost five straight games to begin the season 1–5. Reid accepted the blame for his team's poor start and his future with the Chiefs was called into question. However, the Chiefs won every remaining regular-season game, finishing with an 11–5 record and a wild card spot in the AFC playoffs. Reid would go on to lead the Chiefs to their first playoff win since the 1993 season in a 30–0 shutout of the Houston Texans, but the team was defeated 20–27 in their Divisional Round game against the New England Patriots. Prior to the loss, the Chiefs posted an eleven-game winning streak, which is the best in franchise history. Reid was criticized for his clock management near the end of the game, calling no timeouts in a late fourth-quarter drive that cut the Patriots' 27–13 lead down to a touchdown but took the Chiefs 5 minutes and 16 seconds to score and left them with only a minute and 13 seconds to try and tie the game.

2016–2017 
Reid improved in the regular season with the 2016 Chiefs, who finished with a 12–4 record and clinched their division for the first time since 2010, as well as for the first time under Reid. The Chiefs went undefeated against their AFC West rivals to secure the division title on a tiebreaker with the 12–4 Oakland Raiders and obtain a first-round bye in the playoffs as the AFC's second seed. The bye was the Chiefs' first since 2003.

Despite the team's regular-season success, the Chiefs were eliminated in the Divisional Round for a second consecutive year in an 16–18 loss to the Pittsburgh Steelers. Although the Chiefs were able to prevent the Steelers from scoring any touchdowns, they were unable to match the six field goals Pittsburgh converted.

The Chiefs started strong during the 2017 season, winning their first five games to become the NFL's last remaining undefeated team, including a victory against defending Super Bowl champions New England Patriots in the kickoff game. After their strong start, the Chiefs lost six of their next seven games, resulting in Reid conceding playcalling duties to offensive coordinator Matt Nagy. Nevertheless, the Chiefs won their last four games to finish 10–6 and clinch the AFC West for a second consecutive year, the first back-to-back division titles in franchise history. However, the team ultimately suffered a sixth consecutive home playoff loss in a 21–22 defeat against the Tennessee Titans in the Wild Card Round. Despite holding a 21–3 lead at halftime, the Chiefs were shut out during the second half as the Titans scored 19 unanswered points to win the game.

2018–present

2018 saw new success for Reid and the Chiefs. Aided by the MVP season of quarterback Patrick Mahomes in his first year as the primary starter, the Chiefs finished the regular season as the AFC's top seed for the first time since 1997 and the first time with Reid as head coach by matching 2016's 12–4 record. Reid also extended the franchise record for consecutive division titles through clinching the AFC West for a third straight year. The Chiefs subsequently ended their home playoff losing streak by defeating the Indianapolis Colts 31–13 in the Divisional Round, the first postseason win at home since 1994. With the victory, the Chiefs hosted the AFC Championship for the first time in franchise history, which they lost 37–31 to the eventual Super Bowl LIII champion New England Patriots in overtime.

During the season, Reid recorded his 200th victory to become one of only nine NFL head coaches to win 200 games. With his 206th win at the end of the regular season, Reid also surpassed Marty Schottenheimer for the most wins of an NFL head coach to not win a championship.

The Chiefs again finished 12–4 in 2019 to win the AFC West for a fourth consecutive year and after defeating the Houston Texans 51–31 in the Divisional Round, hosted the AFC Championship for a second consecutive year. Upon securing an appearance in Super Bowl LIV with their 35–24 victory over the Tennessee Titans, Reid became one of only seven head coaches to lead two different franchises to a Super Bowl and the Chiefs made their first Super Bowl appearance since Super Bowl IV in 1970. The 15-year gap between Reid's first and second Super Bowls is the second longest after Dick Vermeil's 19 years. The Chiefs went on to defeat the San Francisco 49ers 31–20, earning the franchise their first Super Bowl victory in 50 years and Reid's first as a head coach.

Reid signed a contract extension with the Chiefs during their bye week in the 2020 season. At the time, the Chiefs were leading the AFC West with an 8–1 record. Three weeks later, they became the first AFC team to secure a playoff berth for the season. Kansas City finished with a league-best 14–2 record to secure the AFC's top seed. The 14–2 record marked the best in franchise history, in addition to being Reid's best as a head coach. During the postseason, the Chiefs defeated the Cleveland Browns 22–17 in the divisional round and the Buffalo Bills 38–24 in the AFC Championship to advance to Super Bowl LV against the Tampa Bay Buccaneers, their second consecutive Super Bowl appearance. The game ended in a 9–31 loss, with the Chiefs failing to score a touchdown and losing by double-digits for the first time under Mahomes. The Chiefs' injury-ravaged offensive line was no match for the Buccaneers' pass rush defense while the Chiefs receivers were neutralized by the Buccaneers' two deep safeties. The Chiefs also committed 11 penalties for 120 yards, including a record eight penalties for 95 yards in the first half, most of which were called against the defense.

Following a Week 4 victory over the Philadelphia Eagles in 2021, Reid became the first NFL head coach to win 100 games with two different franchises. However, the Chiefs began the season 3–4, their first losing record since 2015. Nevertheless, they won nine of their 10 remaining games (including an eight-game winning streak) to clinch the AFC West and the AFC's #2 seed. Reid also won his 227th game to surpass Curly Lambeau as the NFL's fifth-most-winningest coach. In the playoffs, the Chiefs advanced to their fourth consecutive AFC Championship Game after defeating the Pittsburgh Steelers and Buffalo Bills, making Reid the first head coach to lead two different franchises to four consecutive conference championship games. The Chiefs lost the game 24–27 to the Cincinnati Bengals in overtime after surrendering a 21–3 lead, which was tied with the 2006 Indianapolis Colts' comeback against the New England Patriots as the largest in a conference championship.

Reid helped lead the Chiefs to a 14–3 record in the 2022 season. The Chiefs won the AFC West for the 7th consecutive season and earned a first-round bye as the top seed for the AFC playoffs. The Chiefs defeated the Jacksonville Jaguars in the Divisional Round and the Cincinnati Bengals in the AFC Championship to make the Super Bowl for the 3rd time in four seasons. 

Reid's next Super Bowl appearance, Super Bowl LVII, pitted his Chiefs against the Philadelphia Eagles, whom he previously coached.  He led the Chiefs to a narrow 38–35 victory over his former team to earn his second Super Bowl victory as a head coach.

Head coaching record

Coaching tree
Eleven of Reid's coaching assistants have become head coaches in the NFL:
Brad Childress, Minnesota Vikings (2006–2010)
John Harbaugh, Baltimore Ravens (2008–present)
Steve Spagnuolo, St. Louis Rams (2009–2011), New York Giants (2017, interim)
Leslie Frazier, Minnesota Vikings (2010, interim, 2011–2013)
Ron Rivera, Carolina Panthers (2011–2019), Washington Football Team / Commanders (2020–present)
Pat Shurmur, Cleveland Browns (2011–2012), Philadelphia Eagles (2015, interim), New York Giants (2018–2019)
Todd Bowles, New York Jets (2015–2018), Tampa Bay Buccaneers (2022–present)
Doug Pederson, Philadelphia Eagles (2016–2020), Jacksonville Jaguars (2022–present)
Sean McDermott, Buffalo Bills (2017–present)
Matt Nagy, Chicago Bears (2018–2021)
David Culley, Houston Texans (2021)

Personal life
Reid is married with five children, three sons and two daughters. Reid and his family are members of the Church of Jesus Christ of Latter-day Saints.

Reid's oldest son, Garrett, died of a heroin overdose on August 5, 2012. Britt, his youngest son, served under his father until he was not offered a new contract after the 2020 season following his arrest.

Reid has appeared in a commercial for State Farm with Patrick Mahomes. Reid admitted he was reluctant but Mahomes convinced his coach, calling him a "natural" at comedy.

See also

 List of National Football League head coaches with 50 wins
 List of professional gridiron football coaches with 200 wins
 List of Super Bowl head coaches

References

External links

 Coaching statistics at Pro-Football-Reference.com
 Andy Reid at Kansas City Chiefs website
 Andy Reid player profile at BYU Cougars football website

1958 births
Living people
American football offensive linemen
American Latter Day Saints
BYU Cougars football players
Coaches of American football from California
Converts to Mormonism from Lutheranism
Glendale Vaqueros football players
Green Bay Packers coaches
Kansas City Chiefs head coaches
Missouri Tigers football coaches
Northern Arizona Lumberjacks football coaches
Philadelphia Eagles head coaches
Players of American football from Los Angeles
San Francisco State Gators football coaches
Sports coaches from Los Angeles
Super Bowl-winning head coaches
UTEP Miners football coaches